Vladimir Okhotnik (born 28 February 1950) is a French chess player of Ukrainian origin.

In 1979 he won the 44th Ukrainian championship at Dnipropetrovsk. In 2011 he won the World Senior Championship and this achievement automatically earned him the title of Grandmaster. Okhotnik won his second world senior title (in the 65+ category) in 2015.

Tournament results include the following:

 1984: first at Mezőhegyes
 1986: equal 2nd at Satu Mare
 1987: first at Samos; 4th at Halle
 1988: first at the Cappelle-la-Grande Open
 2012: equal first at Villach

In the 1990s he moved to France, taking up French citizenship.

Together with Bogdan Lalić, he wrote two books:

 Carpathian Warrior book one. Secrets of a Master, Pandora Press, 2005 (370 pp.), covering the Pirc, the Modern Defense, the Czech and the Philidor
 Carpathian Warrior 2, Pandora Press, 2008, covering lesser known lines vs. the Pirc and the Modern, as well as other Black systems with a king's side fianchetto.

References

External links
 
 Vladimir Okhotnik chess games at 365Chess.com

1950 births
Living people
Chess grandmasters
French chess players
Ukrainian chess players
Soviet chess players
Chess writers
Sportspeople from Kyiv
World Senior Chess Champions
French people of Ukrainian descent